Ivan Sulev (born 11 September 2006) is a Bulgarian footballer who currently plays as a midfielder for Cagliari.

Career
Sulev started his career in the local Lokomotiv Plovdiv Academy. He made his debut for the first team on 5 December 2021 in a league match against Slavia Sofia. On 31 January 2023 he moved to Cagliari, joining the Primavera side of the team.

Career statistics

Club

Notes

References

2006 births
Living people
Bulgarian footballers
Bulgaria youth international footballers
Association football midfielders
First Professional Football League (Bulgaria) players
PFC Lokomotiv Plovdiv players